Lev Rukhin (  in Moscow – 8 September 1959 in Leningrad) was a Soviet geologist. Doctor of Geological and Mineralogical Sciences (1944), professor of Saint Petersburg State University since 1945. A member of the Communist Party of the Soviet Union from 1941.

Biography
He was born in Moscow. He graduated from Leningrad State University (1933).
Major works are devoted to the lithology and paleogeography. He was one of the first to use statistical methods in studying sedimentary rocks.
He was awarded the "Badge of Honor" and medals.

Works 
  Основы общей палеогеографии, Л., 1959.

References

External links
  geologist Lev Rukhin

Soviet geologists
1912 births
1959 deaths
Russian geologists
Academic staff of Saint Petersburg State University
Saint Petersburg State University alumni